Robert Millhouse (1788–1839) was an English Spenserian poet, born in Nottingham, England.

Contemporaneously compared to Robert Bloomfield and John Clare, he too obtained some fame as a provincial poet, though his own life was affected by his serial marriages, ill-health and poverty. His Poetical Blossoms was somewhat notably edited by fellow Nottingham poet, clergyman and antiquary Reverend Luke Booker, in 1823.

Notable publications
 Vicissitude, a poem in four books and other pieces. 1821.
 Blossoms by Robert Millhouse. Being a selection of sonnets. 2nd edition. 1823.
 The song of the patriot, sonnets, and songs. 1826.
 Sherwood forest, and other poems. 1827.
 The destinies of man. 1832.
 The destinies of man, part second. 1834.
 The sonnets and songs of Robert Millhouse, ed. J. P. Briscoe. 1881.

References

Entry in index of Spenserian poets. 
'The song of the patriot, sonnets, and songs', by Robert Millhouse, at the Internet Archive.

1788 births
1839 deaths
Writers from Nottingham
English male poets
19th-century poets